Renascence is a peer-reviewed academic journal published by Marquette University's English Department, in cooperation with the Philosophy Documentation Center. The journal examines the interaction between literature, moral philosophy, and theology - its subtitle is "Essays on Values in Literature". It occasionally publishes special issues dedicated to particular intellectuals or literary figures, with a particular focus on work that has emerged from the Catholic tradition. All issues are available online.

Abstracting and indexing 
Renascence is abstracted and indexed in Academic Search, Arts and Humanities Citation Index, Catholic Periodical and Literature Index, Current Contents/Arts & Humanities, Humanities Abstracts, Humanities International Complete, Literary Reference Center, MLA International Bibliography, Periodicals Index Online, ProQuest 5000, and Scopus.

See also 
 List of philosophy journals
 List of theology journals

References

External links 
 

English-language journals
Ethics journals
Catholic studies journals
Publications established in 1948
Quarterly journals
Marquette University
Philosophy Documentation Center academic journals